Lee Sang-hyeon better known by his stage name BRLLNT is a Grammy Award nominated DJ/Producer from South Korea born in 1995.

He released his first EP titled "Girl" in 2017 with featuring from Changmo, Sumin, Paul Blanco and DUVV.

He co-produced with Anderson .Paak and Dumbfoundead in 2018 the song Like I Do by American singer Christina Aguilera from her eighth studio album Liberation. The single featuring GoldLink received a Grammy Award nomination for Best Rap/Sung Performance at the 61st Annual Grammy Awards, held in 2019.

In 2019 he produced the song 돈 Call Me (Don Call Me, in Korean Don means Money) for the Korean Rapper Yumdda which was Yumdda's first Chart Ranking song. This song was nominated at the Korean Music Awards for Best Hip Hop Song and at the Korea Hip-Hop Awards for Hip Hop Track of the year. 

In 2019 he produced the song indiGO for the Korean Rapper JUSTHIS & KID MILI & NO:EL & Yang-Hongwon. 

Due to his tie with Soap Seoul holding his regular party called TERRITORY, he released a track named Cash featuring Paul Blanco in 2020 on their newly launched Soap Records label.

Awards and nominations

References

South Korean record producers
1995 births
Living people